Trend Music is a music label owned by Vision Time India Private Limited. The record label had been largely associated with south India music.  The company began operation in 2015.

Film soundtracks released under the Trend Music Label
Zhagaram (2019)
Solo(2017)
Sei (2017)
Natpuna Ennanu Theriyuma (2017)
Meesaya Murukku (2017)
Nan Yar Endru Nee Soll(2017)
Aarambame Attakasam (2017)
Kadamban (2017)
Dharmadurai (2016)
Oru Melliya Kodu (2016)
Thittivasal (2016)
Aakkam (2016)
Kadalai (2016)
Mo (2016)
Vizhithiru (2016)
Kaadhal Kann Kattudhe (2016)
Ammani (2016)
Prabha (2016)
Andaman (2016)
Kadikara Manithargal (2016)
Aangila Padam (2016)
Virumaandikum Sivanaandikum (2016)
Thiraikku Varaadha Kadhai (2016)
Kallattam (2016)
Kaagitha Kappal (2016)
Meera Jaakirathai (2016)
Ka Ka Po (2016)
Sawaari (2016)
Nayyapudai (2016)
Sowkarpettai (2016)
Karaiyoram (2016)
Tharkappu (2016)
Tea Kadai Raja (2016)
Strawberry (2015)
Chandi Veeran (2015)
Vanna Jigina (2015)

References

Indian music record labels
Record label distributors
Companies based in Chennai
Record labels established in 2015
Entertainment companies established in 2015
2015 establishments in India
Indian record labels